The England rugby team's tour of Australasia in the June 2010 saw the team play two tests against Australia, plus two mid-week games against the Australian Barbarians (essentially Australia A) and a final match against New Zealand Māori.

The tour was notable for England's 20–21 victory in the second test, which at that point was only the third time England had beaten Australia on their own soil – the other two occasions both being in 2003, one of which was the World Cup final.

Matches
Scores and results list England's points tally first.

Touring party

Manager: Martin Johnson
Forwards coach: John Wells
Attack coach: Brian Smith
Defence coach: Mike Ford
Scrum coach: Graham Rowntree
Captain: Lewis Moody (Test matches)
Man of Match 1st Test: Quade Cooper (Test matches)
Man of Match 2nd Test: Nick Easter (Test matches)

References

tour
2010 
2010
2010 in Australian rugby union
2010 in New Zealand rugby union
2010 rugby union tours